Ruairí Harkin (born 11 October 1989) is a footballer who plays as a central midfielder for League of Ireland Premier Division club Finn Harps.

Club career

Youth
Harkin began his career at a very young age with Don Boscos. Throughout his career with Don Bosco's, Harkin made several appearances for the Derry and District League Select in the Foyle Cup and also County Londonderry in the Milk Cup. Having turned down opportunities to sign for a number of English clubs, such as Blackburn Rovers, in order to finish his GCSE exams at St. Columb's College, he eventually signed for Charlton Athletic in the summer of 2006.

Senior
Harkin looked set to have a bright future in the game and his ability was praised by coaches. However, the young midfielder failed to play a senior game for the English team and instead languished in the reserves, before being loaned out to non-league outfit, Heybridge Swifts. At the end of 2008, Harkin was released by Charlton and promptly snapped up by his hometown club, Derry City. Harkin was loaned out to Derry's rivals, Finn Harps at the beginning of the 2009 season.  He made 12 appearances for Harps in the early part of 2009 before returning to the Brandywell where he turned out 3 times for the Candystripes before the season ended. Ruairi made 20 league appearances for Derry in 2010, scoring three times, as the club won the First Division title, and in 2011 he made another 20 appearances, though 14 of these came as a substitute. Harkin signed for Coleraine in the Irish Premier League on 5 January 2012. Harkin joined Cliftonville on 1 August 2016 for a fee believed to be £18,000.

International career
Having represented Northern Ireland at Under-16 level, the Derry-born Harkin was later called up to the Republic of Ireland Under-19 squad, where he was capped 4 times between 2006 and 2008.

Career statistics

Honours
 League of Ireland First Division: Derry City – 2010
 League of Ireland Cup: Derry City – 2011

References

1989 births
Living people
Finn Harps F.C. players
Derry City F.C. players
Coleraine F.C. players
League of Ireland players
NIFL Premiership players
Association football midfielders
A Championship players
Association footballers from Northern Ireland
Cliftonville F.C. players
Republic of Ireland association footballers